The 2012–13 Colgate Raiders men's basketball team represented Colgate University during the 2012–13 NCAA Division I men's basketball season. The Raiders, led by second year head coach Matt Langel, played their home games at Cotterell Court and were members of the Patriot League. They finished the season 11–21, 5–9 in Patriot League play to finish in a tie for fifth place. They lost in the quarterfinals of the Patriot League tournament to Lehigh.

Roster

Schedule

|-
!colspan=9| Regular season

|-
!colspan=9| 2013 Patriot League men's basketball tournament

References

Colgate Raiders men's basketball seasons
Colgate
Colgate
Colgate